Methia picta is a species of beetle in the family Cerambycidae. It was described by Linsley in 1942.

References

Methiini
Beetles described in 1942